Efecto Mariposa is a Spanish pop rock group from Málaga, founded in 2001.

Discography

Albums 
 2001: Efecto Mariposa
 2003: Metamorfosis
 2004: Metamorfosis II
 2005: Complejidad' 2007: Vivo en vivo (No. 55 in the Spanish charts)
 2009: 40:04 (No. 25 in the Spanish charts)
 2014: Comienzo Singles 

 Awards 
 Premios 40 Principales 2009 for Best Song (for "Por quererte")
 Premio Cadena Dial for Best Album (for 40:04'')

References

External links 
 Official website
  Efecto Mariposa's profile at Warner Music Spain
 

Musical groups established in 2001
2001 establishments in Spain
Spanish pop rock music groups
Warner Music Group artists
Sony Music Spain artists